PCF theory is the name of a mathematical theory, introduced by Saharon , that deals with the cofinality of the ultraproducts of ordered sets. It gives strong upper bounds on the cardinalities of power sets of singular cardinals, and has many more applications as well. The abbreviation "PCF" stands for "possible cofinalities".

Main definitions 
If A is an infinite set of regular cardinals, D is an ultrafilter on A, then
we let  denote the cofinality of the ordered set of functions
 where the ordering is defined as follows:
 if .
pcf(A) is the set of cofinalities that occur if we consider all ultrafilters on A, that is,

Main results 
Obviously, pcf(A) consists of regular cardinals. Considering ultrafilters concentrated on elements of A, we get that
. Shelah proved, that if , then pcf(A) has a largest element, and there are subsets  of A such that for each ultrafilter D on A,  is the least element θ of pcf(A) such that . Consequently, .
Shelah also proved that if A is an interval of regular cardinals (i.e., A is the set of all regular cardinals between two cardinals), then pcf(A) is also an interval of regular cardinals and |pcf(A)|<|A|+4.
This implies the famous inequality

assuming that ℵω is strong limit.

If λ is an infinite cardinal, then J<λ is the following ideal on A. B∈J<λ if  holds for every ultrafilter D with B∈D. Then J<λ is the ideal generated by the sets . This implies that the cofinality of  under pointwise dominance is max(pcf(A)).
Another consequence is that if λ is singular and no regular cardinal less than λ is Jónsson, then also λ+ is not Jónsson. In particular, there is a Jónsson algebra on ℵω+1, which settles an old conjecture.

Unsolved problems 
The most notorious conjecture in pcf theory states that |pcf(A)|=|A| holds for every set A of regular cardinals with |A|<min(A). This would imply that if ℵω is strong limit, then the sharp bound

holds. The analogous bound

follows from Chang's conjecture (Magidor) or even from the nonexistence of a Kurepa tree (Shelah).

A weaker, still unsolved conjecture states that if |A|<min(A), then pcf(A) has no inaccessible limit point. This is equivalent to the statement that pcf(pcf(A))=pcf(A).

Applications 

The theory has found a great deal of applications, besides cardinal arithmetic.
The original survey by Shelah, Cardinal arithmetic for skeptics, includes the following topics: almost free abelian groups, partition problems, failure of preservation of chain conditions in Boolean algebras under products, existence of Jónsson algebras, existence of entangled linear orders, equivalently narrow Boolean algebras, and the existence of nonisomorphic models equivalent in certain infinitary logics.

In the meantime, many further applications have been found in Set Theory, Model Theory, Algebra and Topology.

References 
 Saharon Shelah, Cardinal Arithmetic, Oxford Logic Guides, vol. 29. Oxford University Press, 1994.

External links 
 Menachem Kojman: PCF Theory
 
 

Set theory